Ending on a High Note Tour was a worldwide concert tour by Norway synthpop/rock band A-ha in support of the group's ninth studio album, Foot of the Mountain, which was released in June 2009  as well as the compilation 25 which was released in July 2010.  It was also a farewell tour, as the band announced, in 2009, their decision to split after a worldwide concert tour in 2010.

The tour began on March 4 at the Estadio Luna Park in Buenos Aires, Argentina and ended on 4 December in Oslo Spektrum in Oslo, Norway, having visited many cities in the United States, Germany, the United Kingdom and several European countries.  The sold out A-ha show in Santiago, Chile, originally scheduled for 6 March, was rescheduled for 23 March following a major earthquake.

Due to demand, the A-ha concert on March 16 in Centro de Convenções (Brasília, Brazil) was moved to a larger venue, Ginásio Nilson Nelson.  Also the capacity for the concerts in Oslo and Bergen in August in Norway had to expand its capacity with 9000 additional tickets to a total of 25 000 tickets for each show.

End of A-ha 
On 15 October 2009, through a press release from the official website of the group, "has stated that after his latest album Foot of the Mountain, with the success enjoyed by both commercial and critical acclaim, had decided that now was the time of final dissolution of the band. In a statement on the news the band thanked all the cooperation and support received throughout their career, they talked and put an end with these words:

Stadium Tour of Norway
For the 6 shows in Oslo between the 21st of August and the 11th of September, A-ha exclusevly built a special stage rig, the largest rig ever put up in Norway so far. The stage was 1,200 Sq meters, weighing over 1,500 tonnes. The rig included a video wall of 600 Sq meters. The stage took 200 men, 4 days to build.

Australian Tour Leg Controversy 
There has been much controversy surrounding the supposed "Australian Leg" of A-ha's Ending on a High Note Tour. Before an official announcement of tour dates it was suggested on A-ha's official website that Australian tour dates would be included in their final world tour.

As further tour dates were announced throughout Europe, North and South America, none were announced for Australia. It was later suggested through the A-ha fan community, West of the Moon, that Australia would not be included in A-ha's final world tour. This turn of events has sparked outrage amongst Australian based fans. Had A-ha returned to Australia, it would have marked their first visit there since they played their first live concerts in 1986 after the initial success of "Take On Me".

Setlist 
The setlist of the concert in the Luna Park on March 4, 2010.
The Bandstand
Foot Of The Mountain
Analogue
Forever Not Yours
Summer Moved On
Move To Memphis
Crying In The Rain
Stay On These Roads
The Blood That Moves The Body
The Living Daylights
Early Morning
And You Tell Me
Scoundrel Days
Cry Wolf
We're Looking For The Whales
Manhattan Skyline
I've Been Losing You
Living A Boys Adventure Tale
Hunting High And Low
Train Of Thought
The Sun Always Shines On TV
Take On Me

The setlist of the concert in the Ullevaal Stadium at August 21, 2010.
The Sun Always Shines On TV
Move To Memphis
The Blood That Moves The Body
Scoundrel Days
Stay On These Roads
Manhattan Skyline 
Hunting High And Low
The Bandstand
We're Looking For The Whales
Butterfly, Butterfly (The Last Hurrah)
(Seemingly) Nonstop July
Crying In The Rain
Minor Earth, Major Sky
Forever Not Yours
Summer Moved On
I've Been Losing You
Foot Of The Mountain
Cry Wolf
Analogue
The Living Daylights
Take On Me

Other songs performed:

 The Swing of Things
 Touchy
 You Are the One
 At the final concert (4 December) they performed the Everly Brothers song "Bowling Green" in the final encore, just before "Take on Me".

Tour dates

References

External links

 Official website

A-ha concert tours
2010 concert tours